Eastbrook (also East Brook) is an unincorporated community in Hickory Township, Lawrence County, Pennsylvania, United States.

Notable person

Calvin Willard Gilfillan (1832-1901), Pennsylvania politician and lawyer, was born near East Brook, in Lawrence County.

Notes

Unincorporated communities in Lawrence County, Pennsylvania
Unincorporated communities in Pennsylvania